Gareth Kean (born 5 October 1991) is a  New Zealand swimmer. He won the silver medal in the 200 m backstroke at the 2010 Commonwealth Games and competed at the 2012 Olympic Games.

Kean is coached by former New Zealand Olympic and Commonwealth swimmer Gary Hurring.  He has held the 100 m and 200 m backstroke national records.

References

Living people
1991 births
New Zealand male backstroke swimmers
Olympic swimmers of New Zealand
Swimmers at the 2012 Summer Olympics
Swimmers at the 2010 Commonwealth Games
Commonwealth Games silver medallists for New Zealand
Sportspeople from Upper Hutt
Commonwealth Games medallists in swimming
Universiade medalists in swimming
Universiade gold medalists for New Zealand
Medalists at the 2011 Summer Universiade
20th-century New Zealand people
21st-century New Zealand people
Medallists at the 2010 Commonwealth Games